Foreshore Estate (ta: பட்டினப்பாக்கம்) is a neighbourhood in Chennai, India. It is situated along the southern stretch of the Marina Beach.

It is one of the primary sites in the city for the immersion of the Ganesh (Vinayaka) idols during the annual Ganesh festival. The idols are first paraded down South Marina Beach (Kamaraj Salai) before being brought to Foreshore Estate for immersion in the sea. The festival takes place in September. Some of the buses plying through Foreshore Estate are 6A, 6D, 12B, 21B, 21D, 21E, 21L, 27D, PP51, PP19, PP21 and PP66.

Location in context

Picture Gallery

Neighbourhoods in Chennai
Coastal neighbourhoods of Chennai